The Mulberry River Bridge, also known as the Silver Bridge and the Wire Ford Bridge, is a historic Pratt through truss bridge northeast of Pleasant Hill, Arkansas, now a neighborhood of the city of Mulberry. The bridge (which is closed for renovations) normally carries Wire Road/Center Point Road across the Mulberry River. In 1927 it was rebuilt when two of the three spans were washed out by the Mulberry River. The bridge is the last known multi-span Pratt through truss bridge in the state.

The bridge was listed on the National Register of Historic Places in 2007.

See also
List of bridges documented by the Historic American Engineering Record in Arkansas
List of bridges on the National Register of Historic Places in Arkansas
Mulberry River Bridge (Turner's Bend, Arkansas), also NRHP-listed
National Register of Historic Places listings in Franklin County, Arkansas
National Register of Historic Places listings in Crawford County, Arkansas

References

External links

Road bridges on the National Register of Historic Places in Arkansas
Bridges completed in 1927
Transportation in Franklin County, Arkansas
Transportation in Crawford County, Arkansas
National Register of Historic Places in Crawford County, Arkansas
Historic American Engineering Record in Arkansas
National Register of Historic Places in Franklin County, Arkansas
Steel bridges in the United States
1927 establishments in Arkansas
Pratt truss bridges in the United States